Blanca Fernández de la Granja (born 1 April 1992 in León) is a Spanish runner competing primarily in middle-distance events. She has represented her country at several World and European cross country championships through different age group categories.

International competitions

References

1992 births
Living people
Spanish female middle-distance runners
Sportspeople from León, Spain
Spanish Athletics Championships winners
20th-century Spanish women
21st-century Spanish women